The Political Constitution of the State of México the constitution of the State of Mexico. The previous constitutions of 1827, 1861, and 1870 were replaced in 1917.

See also 
 List of constitutions of Mexico
 State of Mexico
 Constitution of Yucatán

References 

Mexico
1917 in law
1917 in Mexico
Politics of Mexico
1917 documents